Elijah Sherman Grammer (April 3, 1868November 19, 1936) was an American lumberman and politician who served as a Republican Senator from Washington from November 22, 1932 to March 3, 1933. He was appointed to fill the former seat of Wesley Livsey Jones, who died in office in November 1932.

Biography
Grammer was born in rural Quincy, Missouri on April 3, 1868. He was educated in Missouri and at Bentonville College.  He moved to Washington at age 19 in 1887, where he was a logger and then a general manager in logging camps near Tacoma, Washington.  After completing additional courses at Bentonville College in 1892, he continued to work in the logging business. He moved to Alaska in 1897.

He returned to Washington in 1901, settling in Seattle, which became the major city in the state. Grammer had ownership interests in several logging companies and other business ventures. From 1916 to 1917 he was president of the Employers’ Association of Washington.

During World War I, Grammer was commissioned as a major in the United States Army. He was assigned responsibility for spruce wood production at the mills in Grays and Willapa harbors.

A Republican, on November 22, 1932 he was appointed to the United States Senate by Governor Roland H. Hartley, filling the vacancy caused by the death of Wesley L. Jones in office.  Jones had been defeated for reelection by Democrat Homer Bone earlier in November; Grammer held the seat until March 3, 1933. Bone's term began on March 4.  Grammer's appointment ensured that the Republicans maintained a majority of one during the Senate session that ran from December 1932 to March 1933.

After completing his Senate service, Grammer resumed his business interests in Seattle. He served as manager of the Admiralty Logging Company and president of the Grammer Investment Company.  He died in Seattle on November 19, 1936, and was buried at Lakeview Cemetery in Seattle.

Family
In 1904, Grammer married Emma Parke Kindley.  They had no children, but did act as parents for a niece, Floy Oakley.

External links

1868 births
1936 deaths
People from Hickory County, Missouri
Republican Party United States senators from Washington (state)
Washington (state) Republicans
American manufacturing businesspeople
United States Army personnel of World War I
United States Army officers